Al-Abharī can refer to:

 Muhammad al-Abhari - The Iraqi Maliki scholar (died 996)
 Athīr al-Dīn al-Abharī (died 1265), Iranian philosopher, astronomer, physicist, astrologer, and mathematician
 Amīn al-Dīn al-Abharī (died 1332)

Nisbas